Sir Richard Greenslade Moore  (21 June 1878 – 15 September 1966) was an Australian politician who served as Mayor of the Municipality of Kalgoorlie (Town of Kalgoorlie from 1961) between 1937 and 1966. He was a member of the Western Australian Legislative Council between 1932 and 1936.

Early life
Moore was born in 1878 in Neereman, near Bendigo in the Goldfields region of Victoria to Anne ( Greenslade) and John Moore. His father was a blacksmith and Richard took on his father's trade after finishing school.

Move to Western Australia
In 1900, Moore moved to Kalgoorlie where he worked as a gold miner. Two years later, he set up a blacksmith operation at Broad Arrow, north of Kalgoorlie. In the following years, Moore moved between Kalgoorlie, Perth, back to Victoria; finally returning to Kalgoorlie towards the end of the decade.

Politics
In April 1925, Moore was elected to the Kalgoorlie Municipal Council in an extraordinary election. Moore was elected to the Western Australian Legislative Council in 1932 as one of three members of the North-East Province as a member of the Nationalist Party. Moore resigned his council seat in 1933 to focus on his parliamentary responsibilities. In July 1937, Moore was elected as Mayor of Kalgoorlie following the death of the incumbent, Ernest Brimage.

Honours
Moore was made an Officer of the Order of the British Empire (OBE) in January 1951. In 1960, Moore became a Knight Bachelor.

References

1878 births
1966 deaths
Members of the Western Australian Legislative Council
Australian politicians awarded knighthoods
Mayors of places in Western Australia
Western Australian local councillors